Cannon is a surname of Gaelic origin: in Ireland, specifically Tir Chonaill (Donegal) (North West Ireland). It is also a Manx surname.

Notable people who share the surname "Cannon" 

 Abraham H. Cannon (1859–1896), American Mormon leader
 Ace Cannon (1934–2018), American musician
 Aileen Cannon (born 1981), American judge
 Annie Jump Cannon (1863–1941), American astronomer
 Anthony Cannon (born 1984), American football player
 Arik Cannon (born 1981), American wrestler
 Barbara-Kimberly B.K. Cannon (born 1990), American actress
 Ben Cannon (born 1976), American teacher and politician
 Berry L. Cannon (1935–1969), American aquanaut
 Billy Cannon (1937–2018), American football player
 Catríona Cannon (born 1968), librarian and academic
 Cavendish W. Cannon (1895–1962), American diplomat 
 Charles Cannon (Manitoba politician) (1866–1951), British-Canadian politician
 Charles Albert Cannon (1892–1971), American politician
 Chris Cannon (born 1950), American politician
 Ciaran Cannon (born 1965), Irish politician and publican
 Clarence Cannon (1879–1964), American politician
 Danny Cannon (born 1968), British screenwriter, director and producer
 David Cannon (disambiguation), multiple people
 Don Cannon (born 1979), American DJ, songwriter, and record producer
 Dottie Cannon, American model
 Drew Cannon (born 1990), American statistical analyst and sports writer
 Dyan Cannon (born 1937), American actress
 Edwin Bennion Cannon (1910–1963), American politician
 Elizabeth Anne Wells Cannon (1859–1942), American politician
 Ellis Cannon (born 1959), American television personality 
 Ernestine Cannon (1904–1969), American ceramicist
 Esma Cannon (1905–1972), Australian actress and comedian 
 Frank J. Cannon (1859–1933), American politician 
 George H. Cannon (1915–1941), American Marine Corps Medal of Honor recipient
 George Q. Cannon (1827–1901), British-American religious leader and politician 
 Glenn Cannon (1932–2013), American actor
 Glyn Cannon (born 1976), British playwright 
 Gus Cannon (c. 1883 – 1979), American musician
 Howard Cannon (1912–2002), American politician 
 Ida Maud Cannon (1877–1960), American social worker
 J. D. Cannon (1922–2005), American actor
 James Cannon (1740–1782), Scottish-American mathematician
 James Cannon Jr. (1864–1944), American bishop
 James P. Cannon (1890–1974), American politician
 James W. Cannon (born 1943), American mathematician
 James William Cannon (1852–1921), American industrialist
 Jean Cannon (1941–2005), American model
 Jim Cannon (footballer, born 1953) (born 1953), Scottish footballer
 Jimmy Cannon (1909–1973), American sports journalist
 Joe Cannon (soccer) (born 1975), American soccer player
 John Cannon (disambiguation), multiple people
 Joseph Adrian Cannon (born 1949), American businessman and politician 
 Joseph Gurney Cannon (1836–1926), American politician 
 Kessler R. Cannon (1915–1986), American politician
 Kevin Cannon, American cartoonist and illustrator
 Larry Cannon (disambiguation), multiple people
 Lawrence Cannon (born 1947), Canadian politician
 Lawrence A. D. Cannon (1877–1939), Canadian lawyer and politician 
 Lawrence John Cannon (1852–1921), Canadian lawyer and judge
 Leslie Cannon (1920–1970), British politician 
 Lou Cannon (born 1933), American journalist 
 Lucien Cannon (1887–1950), Canadian lawyer and politician 
 Marcus Cannon (born 1988), American football player
 Marion Cannon (1834–1920), American politician 
 Martha Hughes Cannon (1857–1932), Welsh-American politician and physician 
 Mary Antoinette Cannon (1884–1962), American social worker
 Max Cannon, American cartoonist 
 Michael R. Cannon (born 1953), American businessman 
 Newton Cannon (1781–1841), American politician 
 Nick Cannon (born 1980), American actor and rapper
 Parker Cannon (born 1992), American singer
 Patrick Cannon (born 1966), American politician
 Peter Cannon (born 1951), American scholar
 Philip Cannon (composer) (1929–2016), British composer
 Philip L. Cannon (1850–1929), American politician  
 Reggie Cannon (born 1998), American soccer player
 Sean Cannon (born 1940), Irish musician
 Steve Cannon (disambiguation), multiple people
 Sylvester Q. Cannon (1877–1943), American businessman and religious leader
 T. C. Cannon (1946–1978), American artist
 Thomas Cannon (1720–?), English author 
 Thomas Cannon (philanthropist) (1925–2005), American philanthropist
 Trenton Cannon (born 1994), American football player
 Tyrone Cannon, American psychologist
 Walter Bradford Cannon (1871–1945), American physiologist 
 William Cannon (disambiguation), multiple people
 Zander Cannon (born 1972), American cartoonist

See also
 Frederick Anthony Picariello Jr. (born 1940), American singer known as Freddy Cannon
 Lillian Gruskin (1905–1975), American writer known as Poppy Cannon
 Lucretia Patricia Hanly (c. 1760 – 1829), American slave trader and serial killer known as Patty Cannon
 Thomas Derbyshire (born 1938), British comedian known as Tommy Cannon
 Cannon (disambiguation)
 Cannan

References

Surnames of Irish origin
Anglicised Irish-language surnames
English-language surnames